Mauro Nardoni (born February 18, 1945 in Rome) is a retired Italian professional football player.

He played for four seasons (16 games, no goals) in the Serie A for A.S. Roma, Vicenza Calcio and Brescia Calcio.

See also
Football in Italy
List of football clubs in Italy

References

External links
 Career summary by playerhistory.com

1945 births
Living people
Italian footballers
Serie A players
A.S. Roma players
L.R. Vicenza players
Palermo F.C. players
Brescia Calcio players
U.S. Livorno 1915 players
A.C. Reggiana 1919 players
Avezzano Calcio players
Footballers from Rome
Association football midfielders